The 1901 Lehigh Brown and White football team was an American football team that represented Lehigh University as an independent during the 1901 college football season. In its first and only season under head coach J. W. H. Pollard, the team compiled a 1–11 record and was outscored by a total of 278 to 26.

Schedule

References

Lehigh
Lehigh Mountain Hawks football seasons
Lehigh Brown and White football